The mistresses of Henry VIII included many notable women between 1509 and 1536. They have been the subject of biographies, novels and films.

Confirmed mistresses
Elizabeth or Bessie Blount, mother of his illegitimate son, Henry Fitzroy, to whom Henry VIII gave the dukedoms of Somerset and Richmond. Fitzroy, which means son of the king was acknowledged by Henry and there was talk in the 1530s that the King, who then had no male heir, would legitimise Fitzroy.
Mary Boleyn, sister of Anne Boleyn. It was rumoured that one or both of Mary's children were fathered by the King, although no evidence exists to support the argument that either of them was the King's biological child. Mary is often considered to be Henry's favourite mistress.
Margaret "Madge" Shelton, first cousin of Anne Boleyn. According to Imperial ambassador  Eustace Chapuys, the King had an affair with 'Mistress Shelton' in February 1535, for around six months.

In addition, Henry VIII was involved in a romantic relationship with three of his future wives before he married them. It is unclear if these relationships became sexual before marriage. He was involved with his second wife, Anne Boleyn, from around 1526, around the time he ended his relationship with her sister, Mary; Anne was also, at the time, maid-of-honour to his first wife, Catherine of Aragon. Anne was referred to by some as  "the king's whore" or a "naughty paike [prostitute]".  Henry and Anne's daughter, Elizabeth I, was born (7 September 1533) almost eight months on from their marriage (25 January 1533).

From the beginning of 1536, while still married to Anne Boleyn, he was openly courting his wife's second cousin and maid-of-honour, Jane Seymour. In 1540, he began courting Catherine Howard, the maid-of-honour of his fourth spouse, Anne of Cleves. Catherine was a first cousin of Anne and Mary Boleyn. It appears that his lust for mistresses did not abate as he reached middle age. During his marriage to Catherine Parr, his sixth wife, it was speculated that he would divorce her and look for a seventh wife.

Alleged mistresses
Jane Popincourt, a Frenchwoman, who was a tutor to his sisters.
Anne Bassett, stepdaughter of the King's uncle, Arthur Plantagenet, 1st Viscount Lisle, lady-in-waiting to Jane Seymour, Anne of Cleves, Catherine Howard and Queen Mary I.
Elizabeth Carew, wife of his close friend, Nicholas Carew, and half-first cousin of Anne Boleyn.
Anne Hastings, Countess of Huntingdon, née Stafford, sister of Edward Stafford, 3rd Duke of Buckingham and thus the first cousin once removed of Henry VIII.

Research

Kelly Hart's study The Mistresses of Henry VIII was published in 2009.  In 2010, Mary Boleyn: The True Story of Henry VIII's Favourite Mistress by Josephine Wilkinson was published, and in 2012, Alison Weir published Mary Boleyn: The Great and Infamous Whore. In 2013, this was followed by Bessie Blount: Mistress to Henry VIII by Elizabeth Norton.

Portrayals in media

On Elizabeth Blount
The Tudors, a 2007 TV series, portrayed by Ruta Gedmintas
The Spanish Princess (2020), portrayed by Chloe Harris

On Mary Boleyn
The Other Boleyn Girl, book by Philippa Gregory, and film based on the book
The Last Boleyn, novel by Karen Harper (2006)
Mistress Boleyn – a Novel about Mary Boleyn by Charlotte St. George (2012)
The Tudors, a 2007 TV series, portrayed by Perdita Weeks

On Jane Popincourt
The Pleasure Palace (Secrets of the Tudor Court) by Kate Emerson

On Mary Shelton
Major character in The Lady in the Tower by Jean Plaidy (2003)

On Anne Hastings
Minor character in The Tudors (2007)
Minor character in The Spanish Princess (2020)

On Anne Bassett
Minor character in The Boleyn Inheritance by Philippa Gregory (2006)

See also
Wives of Henry VIII
Children of Henry VIII

References

15th-century English women
15th-century English people
16th-century English women
Henry 8
Women of the Tudor period